Byodo-ji (Byodo Temple literally: Equality Temple) (Japanese: 平等寺) is a Koyasan Shingon temple in Anan, Tokushima Prefecture, Japan. Temple # 22 on the Shikoku 88 temple pilgrimage. The main image is of Yakushi Nyorai (Bhaiṣajyaguru: "King of Medicine Master and Lapis Lazuli Light"). It is designated as Anan Muroto Historical Cultural Road.

History
The temple was constructed during Kōnin era.
In the Tenshō (天正, 1573-1592) era, the temple was burned down by  Chōsokabe Motochika’s (長宗我部 元親) force. 
The temple was reconstructed in the Kyōhō (享保, 1716-1736) era.

Cultural Properties
The painting 'Autumn Grass, colour on paper with gold ground' (紙本金地著色秋草図) in the temple was designated tangible cultural property by Tokushima Prefecture on September 9, 1969.

See also
 Shikoku 88 temple pilgrimage

References

 四国八十八箇所霊場会編 『先達教典』 2006年
 宮崎建樹『四国遍路ひとり歩き同行二人』地図編 へんろみち保存協力会 2007年（第8版）
 阿南市文化財一覧（阿南市）
 List of Cultural Properties of Japan - paintings (Tokushima)

External links
 平等寺：四国八十八箇所霊場第二十二番札所（公式サイト）
 第22番札所 白水山 医王院 平等寺（四国八十八ヶ所霊場会公式）

Shingon Buddhism
Buddhist temples in Tokushima Prefecture
Kōyasan Shingon temples